The Pritzker family is an American family engaged in entrepreneurship and philanthropy, and one of the wealthiest families in the United States of America (staying in the top 10 of Forbes magazine's "America's Richest Families" list since the magazine began such listings in 1982). Its fortune arose in the 20th century—particularly through the founding and expansion of the Hyatt hotel corporation.

Family members still largely own Hyatt, and prior to its sale to Berkshire Hathaway, the Marmon Group, a conglomerate of manufacturing and industrial service companies. Their holdings also have included the Superior Bank of Chicago (which collapsed in 2001), the TransUnion credit bureau, Braniff airlines, McCall's magazine, and the Royal Caribbean cruise line.

The Pritzker family is of Jewish descent, and based in Chicago, Illinois.

Family fortune
In 1995, Jay Pritzker, the cofounder of Hyatt, stepped down and Thomas Pritzker took control of The Pritzker Organization. When the former died in 1999, the family split the business into 11 pieces worth $1.4 billion each (and chose to settle a lawsuit from two family members, who apparently received $500 million each, in 2005). By 2011, the dissolution had been completed, and the cousins had gone their separate ways, with some pursuing business, and others philanthropic or artistic ventures.  According to Inside Philanthropy, there are many Pritzkers, with many different vehicles or foundations for their philanthropic giving.

Genealogy

 Jacob Pritzker (1831–1896) and Sophia Schwarzman (1850–1910)
 Nicholas Pritzker (1871–1957), Jewish immigrant from Kyiv, founder of Pritzker & Pritzker law firm in Chicago and a cousin of the existentialist philosopher Lev Shestov (Schwartzman), married Annie P. Cohn
 Harry Nicholas Pritzker (1893–1957), lawyer at Pritzker and Pritzker law firm, married Elna Stone
 Richard S. Pritzker (1944-2015), married Lori Hart
 Joanne Pritzker (1946–1955)
 Abram Nicholas Pritzker (1896–1986), patriarch of family business enterprise, married Fanny Doppelt
 Jay Pritzker (1922–1999), co-founder of Hyatt, philanthropist, founder of the Pritzker Prize. Married Marian "Cindy" Friend
 Nancy Pritzker (1948–1972)
Thomas Pritzker (born 1950), chief executive of The Pritzker Organization, married Margot Marshall
 John Pritzker (born 1953), married Lisa Stone, 3 children
Adam Pritzker (born 1984), co-founder and chairman of General Assembly, Columbia University trustee
 Daniel Pritzker (born 1959), founder, guitarist and songwriter for the band Sonia Dada, and documentary filmmaker, married Karen Edensword
 Jean (Gigi) Pritzker (born 1962), filmmaker, married Michael Pucker 
 Robert Pritzker (1926–2011), founder of Marmon Group and philanthropist, married to Audrey Gilbert, Irene Dryburgh, and Mayari Sargent
 Jennifer N. Pritzker (born James, 1950), Colonel (Ret), Illinois Army National Guard, founder of the Pritzker Military Museum & Library
 Linda Pritzker (born 1953), Tibetan Buddhist lama, author
 Karen Pritzker (born 1958), married Michael Vlock
 Matthew Pritzker (born 1982)
 Liesel Pritzker (born 1984), actress, married Ian Simmons
 Donald Pritzker (1932–1972), co-founder and president of Hyatt, married Sue Sandel
 Penny Pritzker (born 1959), 38th United States Secretary of Commerce, chairman and CEO of PSP Capital Partners and Artemis Real Estate Partners, 2012 national co-chair of Obama for America, former Stanford University trustee, married Bryan Traubert
 Anthony Pritzker (born 1961), married Jeanne Kriser
  J. B. Pritzker (born 1965), founder of Pritzker Group Venture Capital (formerly New World Ventures), co-founder of Pritzker Group, Governor of Illinois (2019–present), national co-chairman of the Hillary Clinton presidential campaign, 2008, married M.K. Muenster.
 Jack Nicholas Pritzker (1904–1979), real estate developer and lawyer, married Rhoda Goldberg (1914–2007)
 Nicholas J. Pritzker (born 1944), Chairman of the Board and CEO of the Hyatt Development Corporation, married Susan Stowell

Family members fortune
Members of the Pritzker family on the Forbes 400 list of "The 400 Richest Americans 2015":

Legacy
 A.N. Pritzker Elementary School
 Jay Pritzker Pavilion at Chicago's Millennium Park
 Pritzker Architecture Prize
 Pritzker Family Children's Zoo at the Lincoln Park Zoo
 Pritzker College Prep, a Campus of the Noble Network of Charter High Schools
 Pritzker Institute of Biomedical Science and Engineering at the Illinois Institute of Technology
 Pritzker School of Law at Northwestern University
Pritzker Legal Research Center at Northwestern 
 Pritzker School of Medicine at the University of Chicago (UChicago)
 Pritzker School of Molecular Engineering at UChicago 
 Pritzker Marine Biological Research Center at New College of Florida
 Pritzker Galleries of Impressionism and Post-Impressionism at the Art Institute of Chicago
 Pritzker Traubert Family Library at the University of Chicago Laboratory Schools
 The Pritzker Organization
 Pritzker Edition of Zohar (the Book of Radiance), translation & commentary by Daniel Matt and, for last 3 volumes, Nathan Wolski and Joel Hecker; 12 vols, Stanford University Press, 1997-2017
 Pritzker Military Museum and Library-cited earlier in this article.
 Robert A. Pritzker Center for Meteoritics and Polar Studies in the Field Museum of Natural History

See also 
 The Pritzker Estate
 List of largest houses in the Los Angeles Metropolitan Area
 List of largest houses in the United States

References

 
American billionaires
Business families of the United States
Jewish-American families
American people of Ukrainian-Jewish descent